Pauls Svars (born 11 March 1998) is a Latvian ice hockey defenceman playing for Dinamo Riga of the Kontinental Hockey League.

References

External links

1998 births
Living people
Latvian ice hockey defencemen
Dinamo Riga players
Sportspeople from Liepāja